Linaria volgensis is a species of flowering plant in the family Plantaginaceae, native to central European Russia. It is a narrow endemic restricted to a rare type of steppe characterized by a soil of mixed chalk and sand.

References

volgensis
Endemic flora of Russia
Flora of Central European Russia
Plants described in 1993